Mohammad Umar (born 29 December 1997) is a Pakistani cricketer. He made his first-class debut for Lahore Blues in the 2018–19 Quaid-e-Azam Trophy on 1 September 2018. He made his List A debut for Lahore Blues in the 2018–19 Quaid-e-Azam One Day Cup on 6 September 2018.

References

External links
 

1997 births
Living people
Pakistani cricketers
Lahore Blues cricketers
Place of birth missing (living people)